On the Blog is a BBC Radio comedy series starring Caroline Quentin (Men Behaving Badly), Simon Greenall (I'm Alan Partridge) and Andy Taylor (Red Dwarf).
It is written by Kris Dyer, Dave Marks and Andy Taylor and is an Above The Title Production for BBC Radio 2.

Series One (2007)
First broadcast on BBC Radio 2 in the summer of 2007. It was also featured on BBC Radio 4's Pick of the Week programme.

 "Original and twisted - the don't-miss comedy appointment of the week" Radio Times "That rare thing - a funny new radio sitcom" Guardian"The funniest sitcom since Ed Reardon's Week" Sunday Times
 

Series One starred Caroline Quentin, Simon Greenall and Andy Taylor.  The scripts were by Kris Dyer and Dave Marks with Andy Taylor and John Langdon.  It was produced and directed by Dirk Maggs and was an Above the Title Production for BBC Radio 2.
Series One was repeated on BBC Radio 2 on Thursday nights at 10.30pm from 16 April to 21 May 2009.

Series Two (2008)
First broadcast in the summer of 2008 on BBC Radio 2.  It was also featured on BBC Radio 4's Pick of the Week programme.
"A very funny sitcom" Sunday Times"A laugh-out-loud delight" Radio Times

Episode 6 was pulled from transmission by the BBC 
Series Two starred Caroline Quentin, Simon Greenall, DeNica Fairman, Israel Oyelumade, Poppy Taylor-Jones, Kris Dyer, Dave Marks and Andy Taylor as Andrew Glasgow.  The scripts were by Kris Dyer, Dave Marks and Andy Taylor.  The producer was David Morley.  The director was Dirk Maggs.  It was an Above the Title production for BBC Radio 2.
Series Two was repeated on BBC Radio 2 on Saturday nights at 10.30pm from 12 June 2010.

Series Three (2010)
First broadcast in January and February 2010 on BBC Radio 2.
"Cult comedy at its most under-appreciated" The Times"One of my favourite radio comedies" Radio Times

Series Three starred Caroline Quentin, Simon Greenall, DeNica Fairman, Kris Dyer, Dave Marks and Andy Taylor as Andrew Glasgow.  The scripts were by Kris Dyer, Dave Marks and Andy Taylor.  The producer was Adam Bromley.  It was an Above the Title production for BBC Radio 2.
Series Three was repeated on BBC Radio 2 on Saturday nights at 10.30pm from 15 January - 19 February 2011

References

External links

On the Blog on Myspace

BBC Radio comedy programmes
2007 radio programme debuts